The 1893 Kilkenny Senior Hurling Championship was the fifth staging of the Kilkenny Senior Hurling Championship since its establishment by the Kilkenny County Board.

Confederation won the championship after a 1-04 to 0-00 defeat of Callan in the final.

References

Kilkenny Senior Hurling Championship
Kilkenny Senior Hurling Championship